The Cambodian Para-Commando Battalion (French: Bataillon de Commandos Parachutistes – BCP) was one of the main elite military units of the Cambodian Army (French: Armée Nationale Khmère – ANK), part of the Khmer National Armed Forces (French: Forces Armées Nationales Khmères – FANK), which fought in the final phase of the Cambodian Civil War of 1970-75. They were elite paratroopers trained as commandos, as a result, they have a high combat capability as a commando.

Origins
The BCP had its origins in a 60-man contingent sent by the ANK Command in March 1972 to Indonesia to attend the Para-Commando course at the Batujajar Airborne Commando School, near Bandung in West Java. A significant number of the contingent was made of recruits drawn from the Muslim Cham ethnic minority of Cambodia. 
After a nine-month course conducted by Indonesian Kopassus instructors, the contingent returned to Phnom Penh in November 1972.  Upon their return, however, two dozen of its members were posted to the ANK's 5th Infantry Brigade, a predominantly Muslim formation; the remaining 36 Cham graduates were assigned to a ceremonial unit allocated in the Cambodian Capital until 1974.

The commando courses obtained from Indonesia included abseiling, anti-armoured tactics, bomb disposal, climbing in different situations using ropes, combat and patrolling techniques in urban areas, counter-ambushes, demolition, exfil, fast tactical shooting, forward observer, hand-to-hand combat, hit-and-run tactics, infiltrate the area with a helicopter, jungle warfare, living off the jungle and mountain, marksmanship, mountain warfare, parachuting, parachute packing and problem solving, radio communications, raiding tactics, reconnaissance in urban areas, reconnaissance tactics, small unit tactics, tactical emergency medical, tracking tactics, techniques use explosives, techniques use light and heavy weapons, use a map and compass, unconventional tactics, and other skills related to special operations.

Operations
They were then used as the cadre for the BCP and in March 1975, loosely under assignment to the Khmer Special Forces, the Para-Commandos were sent to man the defensive perimeter north-west of Phnom Penh.

See also 
 Cambodian Navy SEALs 
 Khmer Special Forces

Notes

References
Kenneth Conboy, FANK: A History of the Cambodian Armed Forces, 1970-1975, Equinox Publishing (Asia) Pte Ltd, Djakarta 2011. 
Kenneth Conboy, Kenneth Bowra, and Mike Chappell, The War in Cambodia 1970-75, Men-at-arms series 209, Osprey Publishing Ltd, London 1989. 
Kenneth Conboy and Simon McCouaig, South-East Asian Special Forces, Elite series 33, Osprey Publishing Ltd, London 1991.

External links
Khmer National Armed Forces veterans site

Military history of Cambodia
Special forces of Cambodia
Military units and formations disestablished in 1975